Max Clemens Lothar Freiherr von Hausen (December 17, 1846 – March 19, 1922) was a German army commander. He participated in the Austro-Prussian and Franco-German Wars and became Generaloberst of Saxon troops and War Minister in the Kingdom of Saxony. At the beginning of the First World War, he was the head of the Third Army which he led during the Battles of the Frontiers, Charleroi, and the Marne. He was relieved of his command because of illness in September 1914.

Early life
Coming from a military family Hausen entered the Saxon army as a cadet in the royal Saxon school of cadets. Being promoted to Seconde-Lieutenant in 1864 he joined the 3rd Jäger Battalion and served against Prussia in the Austro-Prussian War of 1866; where he saw action at the Battle of Königgrätz. After that war, Saxony allied with Prussia and became a part of the German Empire when it was created in 1871.  From 1871 to 1874 Hausen taught at the Prussian military academy in Berlin and from 1875 until 1887 he served on the Imperial German General Staff. Being the chief of staff of the Saxon army from 1892 to 1895 he commanded the 32nd (3rd Royal Saxon) Division from 1897 to 1900 and the XII (1st Royal Saxon) Corps from 1900 to 1902. He served as Minister of War of the Kingdom of Saxony from 1902 to 1914, being promoted to Generaloberst in 1910. During Hausen's service year as Minister of War, he tried to have a good relationships with Prussian Army. In 1914, Hausen requested to be released from his more than 50 year service.

First World War

Upon mobilization in August 1914, the Royal Saxon Army became the German Third Army and Hausen was given command. His army participated in the Battle of the Frontiers, mainly in the battles of Dinant, where Hausen's troops summarily executed over 600 of its inhabitants, including several women and children (one of them just 3 weeks old), and Charleroi, and he and his army were responsible for the destruction of Reims in September 1914. When asked about how such deeds would eventually be known into history, he replied:

"We should write history ourselves."

After the Second Army's retreat after the First Battle of the Marne, Hausen saw his own flank exposed and ordered a retreat. After the stabilization of the front on the Aisne River, on September 9, 1914, Hausen was relieved of his command due to illness and replaced by General Karl von Einem. Hausen held no further field commands during the war, and died shortly after the war ended. He was occupied by writing about his memories during his last years.

Dates of rank

July 31, 1864:         Sekonde-Lieutenant      (2Lt)
July 31, 1866:	        Premier-Lieutenant      (1Lt)
January 2, 1872:	Hauptmann               (Cpt)
April 1, 1881:	Major                   (Maj) 
April 1, 1887:	Oberstleutnant          (Ltc)
March 20, 1890:	Oberst                  (Col)
March 25, 1893:	Generalmajor            (MGen)
December 17, 1896:	Generalleutnant         (LGen)
May 12, 1901:	        General der Infanterie  (Gen)
December 17, 1910:	Generaloberst           (ColGen)

Decorations and awards

Order of the Rue Crown 
Knight's Cross of the Military Order of St. Henry 
Grand Cross of the Albert Order 
 / 
Order of the Black Eagle 
Order of Merit of the Prussian Crown
Grand Cross of the Order of the Red Eagle with chain 
Iron Cross, 2nd Class of 1870 
Other German states
: Military Merit Order 
 Grand Duchy of Baden: Order of the Zähringer Lion, Knight 1st Class
: Grand Cross of the Order of the Crown 
Foreign

Grand Cross of the Order of Leopold

Notes

References
Barbara Tuchman, The Guns of August (New York, 1972)
Günter Wegner, Stellenbesetzung der deutschen Heere 1815-1939 (Biblio Verlag, Osnabrück, 1993)

External links 
FirstWorldWar.com Who's Who: Max von Hausen

Notes

1.

1846 births
1922 deaths
Barons of Germany
Colonel generals of Saxony
People of the Austro-Prussian War
German military personnel of the Franco-Prussian War
German Army generals of World War I
Recipients of the Military Merit Order (Bavaria)
World War I crimes by Imperial Germany
Military personnel from Dresden